Josip "Pino" Gjergja (also transliterated Đerđa, Djerdja or Giergia; born 24 November 1937), also credited as Giuseppe Giergia, is a retired Croatian basketball player and coach. He represented the Yugoslavia national basketball team internationally. He was nominated for the EuroLeague's 50 Greatest Contributors list in 2008. He was born in Zadar, to an Arbanasi family, hence the variously transcribed name. At a height of 1.76 m (5'9") tall, he played at the point guard position.

Playing career
Gjergja wore KK Zadar's jersey for 18 consecutive seasons, thus becoming one of the club's legends, alongside Krešimir Ćosić. He was a three time Yugoslav Basketball League champion, from 1965 to 1968, and won another two Yugoslav championships, back-to back, in 1974 and 1975. He also won the Yugoslav Cup in 1970.

National team career
Gjergja was a member of the Yugoslav national team. With Yugoslavia, he won two FIBA World Cup silver medals, in 1963 and 1967, as well as a EuroBasket silver medal in 1965. He also participated in two Summer Olympic Games, in 1960 and 1964.

Coaching career
Gjergja began a coaching career after his retirement from playing. As a head coach, he led the senior Croatian national team to the FIBA World Cup bronze medal, at the 1994 FIBA World Championship. In 2003, he coached the club team,
Prishtina, in Kosovo.

See also
Yugoslav First Federal Basketball League career stats leaders

Notes and references
Notes

References

External links 
 Josip Djerdja at FIBAeurope.com
 
 
 

Living people
1937 births
Arbanasi people
Basketball players at the 1960 Summer Olympics
Basketball players at the 1964 Summer Olympics
Croatian basketball coaches
Croatian men's basketball players
Franjo Bučar Award winners
KK Zadar players
KK Zadar coaches
Olympic basketball players of Yugoslavia
P.A.O.K. BC coaches
Point guards
Basketball players from Zadar
Yugoslav basketball coaches
Yugoslav men's basketball players
1963 FIBA World Championship players
1967 FIBA World Championship players